The 1969 election for Mayor of Los Angeles took place on April 1, 1969, with a run-off election on May 27, 1969. Incumbent Sam Yorty was re-elected over councilmember Tom Bradley, a win that had a record-breaking turnout. Yorty used race against Bradley to paint him as a mayor who would be open to Black Nationalism and that he was inefficient against fighting crime, both were denied by Bradley as he was a police officer in the Los Angeles Police Department before his election to the council.

Municipal elections in California, including Mayor of Los Angeles, are officially nonpartisan; candidates' party affiliations do not appear on the ballot.

Election 
Yorty had been criticized by newspapers, mainly with the Los Angeles Times which had published an newspaper on the city's harbor commission and his refusal to endorse Democratic presidential candidate Hubert Humphrey. He was mainly challenged in the race by councilman Tom Bradley, television news anchor Baxter Ward, U.S. Representative Alphonzo E. Bell Jr., and councilman Robert M. Wilkinson. In the primary election, Bradley held a substantial lead over Yorty but did not win the race outright.

In the campaign for the runoff, Yorty questioned Bradley's credibility in fighting crime and said that he would supposedly open up the city to Black Nationalists, as well as saying that he accepted money from developer Bryan Gibson. To the surprise of many pollsters, Yorty won a majority of the vote and was re-elected as Mayor. The election had a record breaking turnout of more than 75% with more than 860,000 votes; the vote count would not be broken until the 2022 election. Bradley and Yorty spent a combinded total of $2 million in their election campaigns, with Yorty spending $817,450 and Bradley spending $1.4 million.

Results

Primary election

General election

References and footnotes

External links
 Office of the City Clerk, City of Los Angeles

1969
Los Angeles
Los Angeles mayoral election
Mayoral election
Los Angeles mayoral election
Los Angeles mayoral election